Big Orange may refer to:

 Tel Aviv, a city in Israel
 Los Angeles, a city in California, USA
 Big Orange (South Australia), a "Big Thing" in Australia
 Gibeau Orange Julep, a roadside attraction in Montreal
 The Big Orange, a popular name for the 100th production Boeing 747, as operated by Braniff International Airways
 Big Orange Chorus, a barbershop men's chorus in Jacksonville, Florida
 Big Orange (horse), British thoroughbred racehorse
 University of Tennessee Volunteer athletics